Pignalberi is a surname. Notable people with the surname include:

Marco Pignalberi (1944–2002), American politician
Quirico Pignalberi (1891–1982), Italian Roman Catholic priest